Artemisia vulgaris, the common mugwort, is a species of flowering plant in the daisy family Asteraceae. It is one of several species in the genus Artemisia commonly known as mugwort, although Artemisia vulgaris is the species most often called mugwort. It is also occasionally known as  riverside wormwood, felon herb, chrysanthemum weed, wild wormwood, old Uncle Henry, sailor's tobacco, naughty man, old man, or St. John's plant (not to be confused with St John's wort). Mugworts have been used medicinally and as culinary herbs.

Distribution
A. vulgaris is native to temperate Europe, Asia, North Africa, and Alaska, and is naturalized in North America, where some consider it an invasive weed. It is a very common plant growing on nitrogenous soils, such as waste places, roadsides and other weedy and uncultivated areas.

Uses
Traditionally, it has been used as one of the flavoring and bittering agents of gruit ales, a type of unhopped, fermented grain beverage. In Vietnam, mugwort is used in cooking as an aromatic herb.

In China, the crunchy stalks of young shoots of A. vulgaris, known as luhao, are a seasonal vegetable often used in stir fries.

In Nepal, the plant is also called titepati (tite meaning bitter, pati meaning leaf) and is used as an offering to the gods, for cleansing the environment (by sweeping floors or hanging a bundle outside the home), as incense, and also as a medicinal plant.

The dried leaves are often smoked or drunk as a tea to promote lucid dreaming. This supposed oneirogenic effect is believed to be due to the thujone contained in the plant.

Description
A. vulgaris is a tall, herbaceous, perennial plant growing  (rarely |abbr=on) tall, with an extensive rhizome system. Rather than depending on seed dispersal, it spreads through vegetative expansion and the anthropogenic dispersal of root rhizome fragments. The erect stems are grooved and often have a red-purplish tinge. The Ukrainian name for mugwort, чорнобиль (chernobyl) transliterates as "black stalk", and the Ukrainian city of Chernobyl gets its name from the plant. The narrow and numerous capitula (flower heads), all fertile, spread out in racemose panicles. It flowers from midsummer to early autumn.

Several species of Lepidoptera (butterflies and moths) such as Ostrinia scapulalis feed on the leaves and flowers of the plant.

Pharmacological properties 
Historically, A. vulgaris was referred to as the "mother of herbs" and has been widely used in the traditional Chinese, European, and Hindu medicine. It possesses a wide range of supposed pharmacological uses, including anticancer, anti-inflammatory, antioxidant, hepatoprotective, antispasmolytic, antinociceptive, antibacterial, antihypertensive, antihyperlipidemic, and antifungal properties.

Phytochemical constituents 
A. vulgaris houses a variety of phytochemicals which are responsible for its pharmacological properties. The phytochemicals belong to classes including flavonoids, essential oils, phenolic acids, coumarins, sterols, carotenoids, vitamins,  and sesquiterpene lactones, among many others. Examples of the phytochemicals include vulgarin, artemisinin, scopoletin, camphene, camphor, sabinene, and some derivatives of quercetin and kaempferol.

References

External links

Plants for a Future: Artemisia vulgaris
Mugwort in 'The complete herbal' by Culpeper
Mugwort 'A modern herbal' by Mrs. Grieve

vulgaris
Herbs
Medicinal plants of Europe
Medicinal plants of Asia
Medicinal plants of Africa
Plants described in 1753
Taxa named by Carl Linnaeus
Oneirogens
Abortifacients